Kutre Dulecha (born August 22, 1978 in Sidamo) is a middle distance runner from Ethiopia. She mainly competes in 1500 metres, where she set a world junior record in 1997. She became world indoor champion in 2004, Ethiopia's first ever women's 1500 m medalist at the championships. She won the women's short course at the 2000 IAAF World Cross Country Championships.

International competitions

Personal bests
800 metres - 1:59.37 (1999)
1000 metres - 2:37.82 (1999)
1500 metres - 3:58.43 (1998)
One mile - 4:39.04 (1997)
15 kilometres - 50:28 (2005)
Half marathon - 1:10:54 (2005)
Marathon - 2:32:29 (2005)

External links

1978 births
Living people
Ethiopian female long-distance runners
Ethiopian female middle-distance runners
Ethiopian female marathon runners
Olympic athletes of Ethiopia
Athletes (track and field) at the 1996 Summer Olympics
Athletes (track and field) at the 2000 Summer Olympics
Athletes (track and field) at the 2004 Summer Olympics
World Athletics Championships medalists
World Athletics Championships athletes for Ethiopia
World Athletics Cross Country Championships winners
African Games gold medalists for Ethiopia
African Games medalists in athletics (track and field)
Athletes (track and field) at the 1995 All-Africa Games
Athletes (track and field) at the 1999 All-Africa Games
Athletes (track and field) at the 2003 All-Africa Games
World Athletics Indoor Championships winners